Team Tre Berg–PostNord is a UCI Continental team founded in 2015 and based in Sweden. It participated in UCI Continental Circuits races until the end of the 2017 season.

Team roster

Major wins
2015
 National Road Race Championship, Alexander Gingsjö
Stage 3 Baltic Chain Tour, Alexander Gingsjö
2016
 National Road Race Championship, Richard Larsén
 National Time Trial Championship, Alexander Wetterhall

National champions
2015
 Sweden Road Race, Alexander Gingsjö
2016
 Sweden Road Race, Richard Larsén
 Sweden Time Trial, Alexander Wetterhall

References

UCI Continental Teams (Europe)
Cycling teams based in Sweden
Cycling teams established in 2015
2015 establishments in Sweden